The men's large hill HS137 individual competition at the 2017 Asian Winter Games in Sapporo, Japan was held on 25 February at the Okurayama Ski Jump Stadium.

Schedule
All times are Japan Standard Time (UTC+09:00)

Results

References

Large Hill team Results - Sapporo Asian Winter Games Official

External links
 Official website

Large Team